"Bossy" is a song by American R&B singer Kelis featuring American rapper Too Short. The song features a Roland 808 drum machine and interpolates "Diamonds on My Neck" by Smitty, which in turns uses a sample of "Dangerous MC's" by The Notorious B.I.G. "Bossy" was released in the United States in April 2006 as the lead single from Kelis' fourth studio album, Kelis Was Here (2006). The song peaked at number 16 on the US Billboard Hot 100, making it the singer's second-biggest Hot 100 hit as well as Too Short's first top-40 hit. "Bossy" also entered the top 10 in Finland and the top 20 in Australia, New Zealand, and Spain and top 30 in UK. On December 11, 2006, the song was certified double platinum by the Recording Industry Association of America (RIAA).

Chart performance
"Bossy" debuted on the U.S. Billboard Hot 100 in early 2006 and peaked at number 16 on the date issued August 5, 2006, becoming her third Hot 100 entry and her second biggest hit after 2003's "Milkshake". The song entered several other Billboard charts, including the Hot R&B/Hip-Hop Songs chart, on which it peaked at number 11.

In the United Kingdom, the single was released on September 4, 2006, and peaked at number 22, a lower position than those reached by the four singles from Kelis' previous album, Tasty. "Bossy" was released in Australia the same day, returning Kelis to the top 20, where it peaked at number 18. The song fared better on the R&B charts of Australia and the UK, reaching numbers four and seven, respectively.

"Bossy" reached the top 10 in Finland, the top 20 in Spain and New Zealand, and the top 40 in Ireland. The single also peaked at number 41 in Belgium and Switzerland, number 56 in Austria, and number 64 in Germany.

Music video

The video for "Bossy", directed by Marc Klasfeld—who would work with Kelis on "Blindfold Me" and "Lil Star" later that year—and produced by Rockhard Films Co was shot in February 2006 in Los Angeles, California.

The video presents Kelis in different scenarios and outfits, depicting an atmosphere from an upper-class world; from a diamond-filled party to a red Enzo Ferrari drive out in the night. It premiered on BET on April 24, 2006.

Charts

Weekly charts

Year-end charts

Certifications

Release history

References

2006 singles
Jive Records singles
Kelis songs
Songs with feminist themes
Music videos directed by Marc Klasfeld
Song recordings produced by Bangladesh (record producer)
Songs written by Sean Garrett
Songs written by Kelis
Songs written by Bangladesh (record producer)
Virgin Records singles